Gulf of Parita or Parita Bay (Bahía Parita) is a large gulf off the coast of Herrera Province, in Panama.

It forms the western section of the Gulf of Panama, and is located between Puerto Obaldia, Coclé and the mouth of the Rio Grande.

See also

References
 

Gulf of Panama
Parita
Parita
Panamanian coasts of the Pacific Ocean
Herrera Province